The Serbian National Defense Council (SND) is a Serb diaspora community organization whose goal is to protect Serbs, the Serbian Orthodox Church and Serbian interests abroad. It is based in Chicago (United States), and also has chapters in Toronto (Canada) and Sydney (Australia).

History

Establishment and the First World War 
SND was founded by Mihajlo Pupin in 1914 in New York City, USA, in midst of anti-Serb tensions leading up to the First World War. Soon after being founded, 83 branches sprung up across the United States and began aiding in the war effort. From 1914 to 1917 SND raised roughly half a million dollars for Serbs in the Balkans, and recruited 17,000 American Serb volunteers to fight on the Salonika front.

World War Two 
By 1941, SND headquarters were relocated to Chicago, Illinois, under the leadership of Mihailo Dučić, and the organization's activities and influence waned. With the arrival of Mihailo's brother, Jovan Dučić, an esteemed poet/diplomat, the Serbian National Defense Council was revived. Throughout the Second World War, the SND was heavily engaged in collecting relief funds for Serbs and supporting the Royal Yugoslav Army which during the resistance was a Chetnik cause, of course, under the command of General Dragoljub Mihailovich, appointed by the London-based Yugoslav government-in-exile at the time.

Post-World War Two 
After World War II, the Pro-Tito US government under the FARA act, began an intensive probe into all Serbian Nationalist organizations in the US, primarily SND, and continued until 1947.

The SND engaged itself closely with the new Chetnik émigré groups which were forming in the United States' Midwest, and appointed Chicago-based Chetnik Voivoda Momčilo Đujić as a trustee of the organization in 1949.

In 1951, chapters of the Serbian National Defense Council were established in Hamilton, Canada under the name of Serbian National Shield Society of Canada and Sydney, Australia.

See also 
 Peter II of Yugoslavia
 Alexander, Crown Prince of Yugoslavia
 Serbian nationalism
 Serbian diaspora
 Serbian Americans
 Serbian Canadians
 Serbian Australians
 Chetniks

References

External links 
 
 

Anti-communist organizations in the United States
Far-right organizations in the United States
Serbian-American culture
Serbian-American culture in Illinois
Serbian-American history
Serbian nationalism
Serbian irredentism
Serbian diaspora
Serb organizations
1914 establishments in New York City
Serb diaspora
Organizations based in Chicago